Equality is a census-designated place in Coosa County, Alabama, United States. It was first named as a CDP in the 2020 Census which listed a population of 150. The Equality post office serves the ZIP Code of 36026, and its delivery area includes rural land to the south in Elmore County.

Demographics

Equality was listed as an incorporated community within the boundaries of Coosa County during the 1920 and 1930 U.S. censuses.

2020 census

Note: the US Census treats Hispanic/Latino as an ethnic category. This table excludes Latinos from the racial categories and assigns them to a separate category. Hispanics/Latinos can be of any race.

Notable persons

Adalius Thomas, former NFL football player
Pauley Perrette, actress best known for playing Abby Sciuto on the U.S. TV series NCIS.

References

Census-designated places in Alabama
Census-designated places in Coosa County, Alabama